Jacques Deschouwer (born 28 February 1946) is a French diver. He competed in the men's 10 metre platform event at the 1972 Summer Olympics.

References

1946 births
Living people
French male divers
Olympic divers of France
Divers at the 1972 Summer Olympics
Place of birth missing (living people)
20th-century French people